A Game Chicken is a lost 1922 American silent romantic comedy film produced by Realart and distributed by Famous Players-Lasky. This film starred Bebe Daniels and was directed by Chester Franklin.

Cast
Bebe Daniels as Inez Hastings
Pat O'Malley as Rush Thompson
James Gordon as Joshua Hastings
Martha Mattox as Camilla Hastings
Gertrude Norman as Senora Juanita Martinez
Hugh Thompson as Jose Maria Lavendera
Max Weatherwax as Jo-Jo
Mattie Peters as Marietta
Charles Force as Captain Snodgrass
Edwin Stevens as Hiram Proudfoot

References

External links

Lobby poster

American silent feature films
Lost American films
Films based on short fiction
Paramount Pictures films
1922 romantic comedy films
American romantic comedy films
Films directed by Chester Franklin
American black-and-white films
1922 lost films
Lost romantic comedy films
1920s English-language films
1920s American films
Silent romantic comedy films
Silent American comedy films
English-language romantic comedy films